Javier Condor (born 24 October 1960) is a Costa Rican judoka. He competed in the men's half-middleweight event at the 1984 Summer Olympics.

References

1960 births
Living people
Costa Rican male judoka
Olympic judoka of Costa Rica
Judoka at the 1984 Summer Olympics
Place of birth missing (living people)